Won by Wireless is a 1911 American silent short film. The film stars William Garwood.

External links
 

1911 films
Thanhouser Company films
American silent short films
American black-and-white films
1910s American films